The 2019 A Lyga was the 30th season of the A Lyga, the top-tier association football league of Lithuania. The season began on 2 March 2019 and ended on 27 November 2019.

Sūduva Marijampolė began the season as defending champions having won their second consecutive league title last year. They secured a third consecutive title in Aukštaitija Stadium on 3 November, after they beat Panevėžys 5–1.

Only five league clubs survived throughout the year – Stumbras folded in the summer, while Atlantas and Palanga were disqualified in the off-season.

Teams
Eight clubs competed – the top six of the 2018 season, the winner of the relegation play-offs and the champions of the 2018 LFF I Lyga. Palanga remained in the league having won the play-offs, while Panevėžys made their top-tier debut replacing relegated Jonava.

Trakai changed their name to Riteriai during the preseason, for a better identification with Vilnius, where the main team has been located since 2014.

Stumbras bankruptcy

Match fixing scandal

Clubs and locations

The following teams competed in the 2019 championship:

 Stadium location

Personnel and kits
Note: Flags indicate national team as has been defined under FIFA eligibility rules. Players and Managers may hold more than one non-FIFA nationality.

Managerial changes

Regular season

Table

Results

First half of season

Second half of season

Championship round

Table

Results

Relegation play-offs
The 7th placed team will face the runners-up of the 2019 LFF I Lyga for a two-legged play-off. The winner on aggregate score after both matches will earn entry into the 2020 A Lyga.

First leg

Second leg

Positions by round
The table lists the positions of teams after each week of matches. In order to preserve chronological progress, any postponed matches are not included in the round at which they were originally scheduled, but added to the full round they were played immediately afterwards. For example, if a match is scheduled for matchday 13, but then postponed and played between days 16 and 17, it will be added to the standings for day 16.

Updated to games played on 9 November 2019

Season statistics

Top scorers

Updated at the end of the season

Hat-tricks

Notes
5 Player scored 5 goals

Attendance

Awards

Monthly awards

Individual

Team of the Month

References

External links
 

LFF Lyga seasons
2019 in Lithuanian football
Lithuania
Lithuania